Palomas rubias (English language:Blond Doves) is a 1920 Argentine romantic comedy film directed and written by José A. Ferreyra with Leopoldo Torres Ríos. The film premiered in Argentina on 18 August 1920.

Cast
María Clais
Modesto Insúa as  Marcelo Agudo
Jorge Lafuente as  Carlos Roig
Lidia Liss as  Elena Carter
Enrique Parigi as  Héctor Carter
José Plá as  El Cuervo
Rodolfo Vismara as  Roberto Recto

References

External links

1920 films
1920s Spanish-language films
Argentine black-and-white films
Films directed by José A. Ferreyra
1920 romantic comedy films
Argentine silent films
Argentine romantic comedy films
Silent romantic comedy films